Elaine Winter (born 1 May 1932) is a South African sprinter. She competed in the women's 100 metres at the 1956 Summer Olympics.

References

External links
 

1932 births
Living people
Athletes (track and field) at the 1956 Summer Olympics
South African female sprinters
South African female hurdlers
Olympic athletes of South Africa
People from Barberton, Mpumalanga
20th-century South African women
21st-century South African women